The MG Cyberster is an all-electric roadster concept car produced by SAIC Motor under the MG marque, revealed in 2021.

Overview

The MG Cyberster concept car was unveiled in pictures on 30 March 2021 and then presented at the Auto Shanghai on 19 April. It was to be presented in 2020, but following the COVID-19 pandemic its presentation was postponed.

The Cyberster receives rear lights incorporating the United Kingdom flag (Union Jack)  like the Mini John Cooper Works GP and interactive "Magic Eye" headlights that open when turned on like the first generation Mazda MX-5.

The MG Cyberster is a "gaming style" EV concept that is inspired by the legendary MGB Roadster of the 60s. The Cyberster concept was first shown at the Shanghai Auto Show in 2021. It was unveiled at the 38th Motor Expo in December 2021. At the time, there wasn't much information available about the Cyberster, but the production model was purportedly under development to reach Thailand in 2023.

References

Cyberster
Electric sports cars
Concept cars